Pecora Escarpment is an irregular escarpment, 7 nautical miles (13 km) long, standing 35 nautical miles (60 km) southwest of Patuxent Range and marking the southernmost exposed rocks of the Pensacola Mountains. Mapped by United States Geological Survey (USGS) from surveys and U.S. Navy air photos, 1956–66. Named by Dwight Schmidt, geologist to the Pensacola Mountains, 1962–66, for William T. Pecora, eighth director of the U.S. Geological Survey, 1965–71.

Features
Geographical features include:

 Damschroder Rock
 Horton Ledge
 Lulow Rock
 Patuxent Ice Stream

References

Escarpments of Queen Elizabeth Land